Arnošt Klimčík (24 July 1945 in Karviná - 21 March 2015) was a Czechoslovak handball player who competed in the 1972 Summer Olympics.

He was part of the Czechoslovak team which won the silver medal at the Munich Games. He played one match.

On a club level Klimčík played for HC Baník Karviná.

External links

 Profile at Sports-Reference.com

1945 births
2015 deaths
Czech male handball players
Czechoslovak male handball players
Olympic handball players of Czechoslovakia
Handball players at the 1972 Summer Olympics
Olympic silver medalists for Czechoslovakia
Olympic medalists in handball
Medalists at the 1972 Summer Olympics
Sportspeople from Karviná